Dundy County is a county in the U.S. state of Nebraska. As of the 2020 United States Census, the population was 1,654. Its county seat is Benkelman.

In the Nebraska license plate system, Dundy County is represented by the prefix 76 (it had the seventy-sixth-largest number of vehicles registered in the county when the license plate system was established in 1922).

History 
Dundy County was formed in 1873 and attached to neighboring Hitchcock County. It was named after Judge Elmer Scipio Dundy. The county government was organized in 1884.

Geography 
Dundy County lies at the lower SW corner of Nebraska. Its west boundary line abuts the east line of the state of Colorado, and its south boundary line abuts the north boundary line of the state of Kansas.

Major highways 
  U.S. Highway 34
  Nebraska Highway 27
  Nebraska Highway 61

Adjacent counties 

 Hitchcock County – east
 Rawlins County, Kansas – southeast
 Cheyenne County, Kansas – south
 Yuma County, Colorado – west
 Chase County – north
 Hayes County – northeast

Protected areas 
 Rock Creek State Recreation Area

Demographics 

As of the 2000 United States Census, there were 2,292 people, 961 households, and 637 families in the county. The population density was 2 people per square mile (1/km2). There were 1,196 housing units at an average density of 1 per square mile (0/km2). The racial makeup of the county was 96.95% White, 0.04% Black or African American, 0.79% Native American, 0.48% Asian, 0.04% Pacific Islander, 0.87% from other races, and 0.83% from two or more races. 3.23% of the population were Hispanic or Latino of any race. 41.9% were of German, 13.2% American, 13.2% English and 6.3% Irish ancestry.

There were 961 households, out of which 27.80% had children under the age of 18 living with them, 59.90% were married couples living together, 3.90% had a female householder with no husband present, and 33.70% were non-families. 30.90% of all households were made up of individuals, and 17.60% had someone living alone who was 65 years of age or older. The average household size was 2.29 and the average family size was 2.87.

The county population contained 23.30% under the age of 18, 5.70% from 18 to 24, 23.50% from 25 to 44, 25.10% from 45 to 64, and 22.40% who were 65 years of age or older. The median age was 44 years. For every 100 females there were 96.90 males. For every 100 females age 18 and over, there were 93.40 males.

The median income for a household in the county was $27,010, and the median income for a family was $35,862. Males had a median income of $22,415 versus $18,583 for females. The per capita income for the county was $15,786. About 11.00% of families and 13.60% of the population were below the poverty line, including 16.10% of those under age 18 and 15.00% of those age 65 or over.

Communities

City 
 Benkelman (county seat)

Village 
 Haigler

Other unincorporated communities 
 Lamont
 Max
 Parks
 Sanborn

Former communities 
 Ough

Census-designated places 
 Max
 Parks

Politics 
Dundy County voters are reliably Republican. In only three national elections since 1900 has the county selected the Democratic Party candidate (as of 2020).

See also 
 National Register of Historic Places listings in Dundy County, Nebraska

References

External links 

 
Nebraska counties
1884 establishments in Nebraska